Little Blue Lake is a water-filled doline in the Australian state of South Australia located in the state's south-east in the locality of Mount Schank about  south of the municipal seat of Mount Gambier.  It is notable locally as a swimming hole and nationally as a cave diving site.  It is managed by the District Council of Grant and has been developed as a recreational and tourism venue.

Naming
The sinkhole's name is attributed to the property of its water to turn blue in colour on an annual basis in a similar manner to the Blue Lake.  However in more recent times the sinkhole generally remains  green in colour throughout most of the year. This is believed by some to be due to groundwater pollution from agricultural fertilizers increasing the nutrient levels.   The lake is also known as Baby Blue and is referenced in caving literature by its Cave Exploration Group of South Australia (CEGSA) Inc. identification number, 5L9.

Description

The lake is located on crown land in section 963 in the cadastral unit of the Hundred of MacDonnell.

Access to the water’s edge is via an artificial cutting in the south side of the sinkhole.

An undercut ledge reaches a maximum depth of approximately  along the full extent of both the south (i.e. under Mount Salt Road) and the west sides of the sinkhole’s bottom.

A notable feature of the lake is the accumulation of rubbish dumped in the lake over a period of several decades including a 1966 Morris 1100, a bowser, traffic signs and ’witches hats’.

Geological origins
The Little Blue Lake is one of a number of similar landforms occurring in the area to the south of the dormant volcano in Mount Gambier including the area around the dormant volcano at Mount Schank. These cenotes are similar in form as they all have collapse dolines with circular plans, cliffs, lakes filled to the water table, large rubble cones on their floors and clustered together in several groups along in the flat coastal plain composed of a Miocene limestone known as Gambier Limestone. It is theorised that these cenotes were formed by the collapse of large underground water-filled chambers following the lowering of sea levels at the most recent Glacial Maximum about 20,000 years ago. The chambers themselves are likely to have been formed by groundwater acidified by gaseous Carbon Dioxide (CO2) rising up through fractures from the magma chambers during the volcanic eruptions occurring during the Pleistocene and the Holocene rather than by the usual acidification process involving the absorption of atmospheric CO2 by water prior to entering the water table. The cenotes then filled with freshwater as the sea level started to rise at about 8,000 years ago. The presence of stromatolites in at least eight cenotes including the Little Blue Lake is suggested as being an indicator of the recent formation of these landforms.

Exploration
Exploration of the lake's underwater environment commenced in the 1950s. The lake’s submerged extent was surveyed by Lewis and Stace in 1980 and by the Cave Divers Association of Australia (CDAA) during the 1990s.

Present day
The lake is a popular venue for swimming and cave diving.   

The land which includes the sinkhole was dedicated as a reserve "for the purposes of a Public Pleasure Resort" under the Crown Lands Act 1929 on 19 March 1986 and placed under "the Care, Control and Management" of the former District Council of Port MacDonnell.

The District Council of Grant installed stairs and a floating pontoon in 2002 to improve the lake’s amenity for both residents and visitors after a review of public safety.  A parking area also exists on the lake's east side. Access for cave diving is limited to holders of the CDAA Deep Cavern grade.

See also

References

External links
 Little Blue Lake Cliff Jumping

Sinkholes of Australia
Limestone Coast
Underwater diving sites in Australia
Lakes of South Australia
Swimming venues in Australia